The Ulster Gazette, also known as the Ulster Gazette and Armagh Standard is a newspaper based in Armagh, Northern Ireland, UK. It is published by the Alpha Newspaper Group and has had the largest readership in the Armagh city and district since 1844.

The Gazette circulates throughout the entire City and District of Armagh and in some parts of Portadown.

The newspaper's circulation in 2013 was an average of 7,130 copies sold a week.

References

External links
Ulster Gazette website

Newspapers published in Northern Ireland
Mass media in County Armagh
Armagh (city)
Publications established in 1844